WCW/New Japan Supershow was an annual professional wrestling pay-per-view (PPV) event jointly produced by World Championship Wrestling (WCW) and New Japan Pro-Wrestling (NJPW). It was held in 1991, 1992 and 1993, and was promoted as "Starrcade" in Japan, but not billed as such in the United States due to WCW already having a show called "Starrcade" held each year in December. The show would be taped in Japan and then edited and aired in North America at a later date in WCW. The final two were also the first two January 4 Dome Shows. The events are some of the few pay-per-views not made available for streaming on the WWE Network service.

Events

See also

List of New Japan Pro-Wrestling pay-per-view events
List of NWA/WCW closed-circuit events and pay-per-view events
Collision in Korea

References

 
Events in Tokyo